The 2021 Belgian Road Cycling Cup (known as the Bingoal Cycling Cup for sponsorship reasons) was the sixth edition of the Belgian Road Cycling Cup. As no overall winner was declared during the 2020 edition, there was no defending champion.

After leading the standings after every round, Tim Merlier won the cup, having secured two victories and top-ten finishes in all but two of the other races.

Events 
With respect to the previous season, the Antwerp Port Epic was added, and both Le Samyn and the Grote Prijs Jef Scherens returned after last appearing during the 2018 edition. As a result, the number of events increased to eleven. In the end, only eight events remained, as Halle–Ingooigem, the Schaal Sels, and the Memorial Rik Van Steenbergen were all eventually cancelled.

Race results

Le Samyn

Grote Prijs Jean-Pierre Monseré

Circuit de Wallonie

Dwars door het Hageland

Grote Prijs Jef Scherens

Grote Prijs Marcel Kint

Antwerp Port Epic

Kampioenschap van Vlaanderen

Final cup standings 
, after the Kampioenschap van Vlaanderen

Notes

References

External links 
 Official website 

Belgian Road Cycling Cup
Belgian Road Cycling Cup
Road Cycling Cup